Mark Gill is an English screenwriter and film director. He is from Stretford in Manchester.

Gill graduated from University of Central Lancashire in 2007, and soon after he met his collaborator Baldwin Li. Gill has won numerous awards, including a Royal Television Society Award. In 2014 Gill and fellow producer Baldwin Li were nominated for an Academy Award for Best Live Action Short Film for their film The Voorman Problem, as well as receiving a BAFTA Award for Best Short Film nomination in 2013 

Gill co-wrote and directed England Is Mine, a biopic based on the early life of Morrissey. It premiered at the closing gala of the Edinburgh Film Festival on 2 July 2017, and will go into wide release in the UK in August 2017.

References

External links

Alumni of the University of Central Lancashire
BAFTA winners (people)
British film directors
Living people
Year of birth missing (living people)
Place of birth missing (living people)